Martha Wallner (28 March 1927 – 21 March 2018) was an Austrian stage actress. She also appeared in films and television. She was awarded the Kammerschauspielerin (an Austrian title of honor). Married to the actor Erich Auer, she died a week before her 91st birthday.

Selected filmography
 Liebesprobe (1949)
 The Last Ten Days (1955)
 The Street (1958)
 The Castle (1968)
 Tales from the Vienna Woods (1978)

References

External links

1927 births
2018 deaths
Austrian film actresses
Austrian television actresses
Actresses from Vienna